Erick Swen Pohlhammer Boccardo (born 1955) is a Chilean poet of the Generation of the 80s, a self-described "media figure, traveler, compulsive reader, Zen Buddhist, and expert in both academic and pop culture."

Biography
Erick Pohlhammer studied at The Grange School, from which he graduated in 1972 and then entered the Catholic University, where he obtained the title of professor of Castilian. At the same time, he studied aesthetics, a degree he did not complete because he decided to go to the United States where he earned a postgraduate degree in education at the University of Miami.

Passionate about football, Pohlhammer, who is the nephew of the legendary "Sapo" Livingstone, played in his youth for his alma mater's sports club; he was under-15, under-16, and under-17 captain  on squads with players such as Orlando Ramírez, under the direction of Fernando Riera. During his youth he practiced amateur boxing; he won 37 victories (32 of them by knockout) on the La Reina–Peñalolén circuit. He was champion of that neighborhood in a tournament held at the José Arrieta Guindos Stadium and, later, from the English schools of Santiago. He also participated in rugby and swimming.

Pohlhammer published his first book in 1979, but fell in love with writing earlier, as he himself said, at age 19, when he was in his second year of university. His first important recognition came in 1993, when he was granted the Pablo Neruda Award. Later he received other distinctions, including the 2008 Santiago Municipal Literature Award for his poetry collection Vírgenes de Chile.

In 2015 he held his first exhibition of digital prints, Pic-poemas.

He teaches literature courses at various universities and conducts workshops. He has participated as a panelist and writer on various television programs (Teatro terapia, Lo mejor del Mundial, ¿Cuánto vale el show?, Sin Dios ni late, Síganme los buenos) and has been president of the Union of Chilean Poets and minister of happiness of the cultural-political movement Por un Chile Participativo y Feliz. He is interested in breathing techniques and considers Prem Rawat one of his teachers.

Works

Poetry collections
 Epístolas iluminadas entre parejas disueltas, 1979
 Tiempos difíciles, 1979
 Es mi segundo set de poemas, 1985
 Gracias por la atención dispensada, Editorial Sin Fronteras, 1986
 Vírgenes de Chile, Editorial Brodura, 2007
 La hamaca interior, proverbs and poems, Editorial Libros de Mentira, 2010
 Me que la vaca mu, Editorial Lamás médula, Buenos Aires,  2013
 Primera y última, anthology, Lolita editores, 2014, 98 pages, 
 Bajo la influencia de la poesía, Libros del Amanecer, Santiago de Chile, 2017

Other books
 El fútbol como la vida, Editorial Universidad Bolivariana, stories, 2007, 
 Redonda pasión. Épica y lírica del fútbol chileno, as compiler, together with journalist Juan Oyaneder, 2011
 Oxímoron. Conversaciones con Dino Samoiedo, with foreword by Camilo Marks; RIL editores, Santiago, 2013

Exhibitions
 Pic-poemas, digital prints; Galería Modigliani, Viña del Mar, 2015

Awards and recognitions
 1993 Pablo Neruda Award
 1993 Don Balón Award for sports poetry (Don Balón magazine)
 2002 Fray Luis de León Award (Spain)
 2008 Santiago Municipal Literature Award for the poetry collection Vírgenes de Chile

References

1955 births
20th-century Chilean poets
20th-century Chilean male writers
21st-century Chilean poets
21st-century Chilean male writers
Chilean academics
Chilean male poets
Living people
Pontifical Catholic University of Chile alumni
University of Miami School of Education alumni
Writers from Santiago